The 1977 Cincinnati Bengals season was the franchise's 8th season in the National Football League, and the 10th overall. Second-year Running Back Archie Griffin struggled to learn the NFL game rushing for only 549 yards while failing to cross the end zone. A loss to Houston in the final game cost the Bengals a spot in the playoffs. The team finished with an 8–6 record.

Offseason

NFL Draft

Personnel

Staff

Roster

Regular season

Schedule 

Note: Intra-division opponents are in bold text.

Season summary

Week 5 at Steelers 

Bob Trumpy was knocked out of the game by Mel Blount

Week 8

Week 11

Standings

References 

 Bengals on Pro Football Reference
 Bengals Schedule on jt-sw.com
 Bengals History on Official Site

Cincinnati Bengals
Cincinnati Bengals seasons
Cincinnati